30 Minute Meals is a Food Network show hosted by Rachael Ray.  Her first of four shows on Food Network, its original run aired from November 17, 2001, until May 5, 2012. The show specializes in convenience cooking for those with little time to cook. The show is recorded live-to-tape, with Ray doing almost all preparation in real time.  The show was awarded an Emmy for Best Daytime Service Show in 2006.

A common feature on the program is the creation of new versions of classic dishes (including clam chowder and macaroni and cheese), some of which are traditionally slow to cook.  Ray focuses on creating meals in less than 30 minutes.
Ray has also done two specials with the title Thanksgiving in 60, about preparing a Thanksgiving dinner in one hour.

Each episode Ray opens the show by saying "Hi there, I'm Rachael Ray and I make 30-minute meals. Now that means in the time it takes you to watch this program, I will have made a delicious and healthy meal from start to finish."

A 30-episode revival was announced on January 25, 2019 and began airing on April 1, 2019.

About the show 

Rachael Ray's 30 Minute Meals, based on the cookbook series, debuted on November 17, 2001, and ended production in 2012, then was revived in 2019. After writing and releasing her cookbook in 1999, Rachael Ray went on NBC's Today to make soup with Al Roker. Two weeks later, she had two pilot shows on TV.

Criticism of the show 

Criticism of Rachael Ray's show has been levied despite its successes. Ray had no formal cooking experience, leading to complaints about the appearance of her food.

Charlie Dougiello, Ray's director of publicity stated, "Rachael always says that some of the criticisms of her as a chef are correct. She is not a chef. She whips up meals in a way some chefs would cringe at. If she slips up, she slips up. We don't stop taping. It is just like life."

Books 

The TV series has also led to a group of cookbooks.

Since the original 30 Minute Meals: Comfort Foods
came out, several other books have also been published:

References

External links
 30 Minute Meals at foodnetwork.com
 30 Minute Meals at Rachael Ray's Official Site
 

2001 American television series debuts
2000s American cooking television series
2010s American cooking television series
Food Network original programming
2012 American television series endings
2019 American television series debuts
American television series revived after cancellation